The Administration Building is a historic building on the campus of Lake Erie College in Painesville, Ohio, United States. It was listed on the National Register of Historic Places in 1973.

References

External links
Lake Erie College

School buildings on the National Register of Historic Places in Ohio
Buildings and structures in Lake County, Ohio
National Register of Historic Places in Lake County, Ohio
University and college buildings completed in 1859
University and college administration buildings in the United States
1859 establishments in Ohio